Cian Oba-Smith (born 1992) is an Irish Nigerian fine-art / documentary photographer from London.

Life and work 
Oba-Smith was born and raised in London, England. He studied photography at the University of the West of England, graduating in 2014.

Oba-Smith has made various projects throughout his career including A Quiet Prayer , a record of London in the first lockdown during the covid pandemic, Shanzhai, an exploration of the phenomena of copycat architecture in China, Concrete Horsemen , highlighting the forgotten contributions of African American horsemen in North Philadelphia, Andover & Six Acres  ,  an interrogation of the negative stereotypes placed upon the estates in North London and Bikelife ,  a documentation of urban dirt-bike and wheelie culture in London.

Oba-Smith self published his first book Bikelife  in 2016. In 2019 his book Andover & Six Acres was published by Lost Light Recordings.

In 2019 he completed an artist residency at Light Work in Syracuse, NY where he created a project on redlining and the links between historical segregation policy and contemporary communities.

Alongside his artistic practice, Oba-Smith works on commissions for various publications such as FT Weekend, The Face, M Magazine Le Monde, The Guardian, The Telegraph, Crack Magazine, Vice and others.

Publications

Publications by Oba-Smith 

 Bikelife. Self Published, 2016 
 Andover & Six Acres. Lost Light Recordings, 2019.

Group Publications 

 Unseen London. Hoxton Mini Press, 2017. 
 Invisible Britain: Portraits of Hope and Resilience. Policy Press, 2018. 
 There, There Issue One. theretherenow, 2019.
 Contact Sheet 207: Light Work Annual. Light Work, 2020.

Awards 

 2015: Winner, D&AD New Blood Award.
 2016: Shortlist, Magnum & Photo London Graduate Award.
 2017: Shortlist, D&AD Next Photographer Award.
 2017: Shortlist, Magnum & Photo London Graduate Award.
 2017: Winner, Feature Shoot Emerging Photography Award.
 2017: Winner, I.P.F Photo Prize.
 2017: Winner, Magenta Flash Forward.
 2017: Selected, Taylor Wessing Photographic Portrait Prize.
 2018: Selected, Portrait Salon.
 2019: Selected, Lightwork Artist-In-Residence (AIR) Program.
 2020: Shortlist, Foam Paul Huf Award.
 2020: Selected, Portrait of Humanity.
 2022: Winner, People’s Pick Award, Taylor Wessing Photographic Portrait Prize.

References

External links 

 Official website
 The Unexposed interview and working process (video)
 Negative Feedback interview (video)

Documentary photographers
Fine art photographers
21st-century British photographers
Photographers from London
Irish people of Nigerian descent
1992 births
Living people